Alexei Komarov (born June 11, 1978) is a Russian former professional ice hockey defenceman.  He played in the Russian Superleague for Dynamo Yekaterinburg, HC Spartak Moscow, HC Dynamo Moscow, HC MVD, Vityaz Chekhov and Krylya Sovetov Moscow. He also played in the American Hockey League for the Utah Grizzlies.  He was drafted 216th overall in the 1997 NHL Entry Draft by the Dallas Stars.

External links

1977 births
Living people
Dallas Stars draft picks
HC Dynamo Moscow players
HC MVD players
HC Spartak Moscow players
Krylya Sovetov Moscow players
Russian ice hockey defencemen
Utah Grizzlies (AHL) players
HC Vityaz players
Ice hockey people from Moscow